James "Slim" Hand (July 7, 1952 – June 8, 2020) was an American country music singer and songwriter.

Early life
James Edward Hand was born on July 7, 1952 in Waco, Texas. He was raised in the community of Tokio in McLennan County, Texas, and took to guitar playing and singing when approximately twelve years old. He worked in various jobs, including horse training and driving a truck. About his work with animals, Hand said, “People act like it’s some big deal, like this whole horse whispering thing. But I’ll tell you something – you can whisper to ’em, you can get down on your knees and act like ’em, but the horse knows you ain't a horse."

Career
As a teenager, Hand joined a small band and began performing in honky-tonks and roadhouses across Central Texas. At some point he started to write and perform his own songs. After many years of live performances, he released his first album in 1999, when he was 47 years old.

In 2014, Hand played a fictional version of himself in the independent film Thank You a Lot. The Austin Film Society's website noted that Hand and co-protagonist Blake DeLong, playing his son, had a chemistry that was "hilariously realistic".

About the life he sings about, Hand once remarked: "I don't know if I've been more blessed or cursed. But I've been diversified."

Critical appraisal
Reviewers have generally emphasized the "authenticity" of Hand's songs. His music reportedly can match the "rigor" of historical performers of country music, "with the slightest touch of outlaw bluster," while his voice can be "uncertain in moments." On the release of his first album, one reviewer wrote that Hand "sings the songs as if he has lived every minute of them," while The Washington Post'''s reviewer called him "the real deal," a view shared also by Willie Nelson.

Death and legacy
On June 8, 2020, Hand died from complications of heart failure at the Providence Healthcare Center in Waco, Texas.

On February 26, 2021, Charley Crockett released a tribute album to Hand titled 10 For Slim: Charley Crockett Sings James Hand.  It was met with critical acclaim from Rolling Stone, The Boot, Austin American-Statesman, Forbes, Saving Country Music, and American Songwriter among others.

DiscographyShadows Where the Magic Was (1997)Evil Things, on Cold Spring Records (1999)	Live From The Saxon Pub Austin TX, on Knight Klub Records (2003)	The Truth Will Set You Free, on Rounder Records (2006)Shadow on the Ground, on Rounder Records (2009)Mighty Lonesome Man, on Hillgrass Bluebilly Records (2012)		Stormclouds in Heaven'', on Slim Hand Music (2014)

References

External links

Official website
 

1952 births
2020 deaths
20th-century American guitarists
20th-century American singers
20th-century American male singers
21st-century American singers
21st-century American male singers
American acoustic guitarists
American country guitarists
American country singer-songwriters
American male film actors
American male guitarists
American male singer-songwriters
Country musicians from Texas
Guitarists from Texas
Male actors from Texas
People from McLennan County, Texas
People from Waco, Texas
Rounder Records artists
Singer-songwriters from Texas